is a town located in Sorachi Subprefecture, Hokkaido, Japan.

As of September 2016, the town has an estimated population of 6,787, and a population density of 14 persons per km2. The total area is 495.62 km2.

In 1890, the people from Totsukawa in Nara Prefecture reclaimed land.

Culture

Mascot

He is a rice ghost that likes rice and sake.

Notable people from Shintotsukawa
Yoshio Hachiro, politician

References

External links

Official Website 

Towns in Hokkaido